Anisacanthidae is a family of walkingsticks in the order Phasmatodea. There are about 10 genera and at least 30 described species in Anisacanthidae.

Genera
These 10 genera belong to the family Anisacanthidae:
 Amphiphasma c g
 Anisacantha c g
 Archantherix c g
 Cenantherix c g
 Leiophasma c g
 Paranisacantha c g
 Parectatosoma c g
 Parorobia c g
 Somacantha c g
 Xerantherix c g
Data sources: i = ITIS, c = Catalogue of Life, g = GBIF, b = Bugguide.net

References

Further reading

 
 
 
 
 
 
 
 
 

Phasmatodea families